I Can't Sleep is a 1994 French drama film written and directed by Claire Denis. It was screened in the Un Certain Regard section at the 1994 Cannes Film Festival. The film was loosely inspired by the murders committed by Thierry Paulin.

Plot
Daiga (Yekaterina Golubeva), a woman from Lithuania, immigrates to Paris with little money but hopes to secure herself a job as an actor. When her plans fall through, she begins work as a maid in the hotel of a friend of her great-aunt.

At the same time Theo (Alex Descas) is embroiled in a fight with his wife, as he wants to leave for Martinique with their young son while she wants to remain in Paris. He is infrequently visited by his brother, Camille.

Meanwhile, the city is on edge because of a series of violent murders that have targeted elderly women living alone. The murders are being committed by Camille and his lover. The two live in the hotel run by Daiga's employer.

Eventually Daiga begins to follow Camille around. She figures out that he is the murderer after spotting a police sketch of his face. After breaking into his room, she finds a bag of cash and steals it, leaving abruptly to go back to Lithuania.

Camille is spotted by police after one of his victims recovers enough to give a description of him. Theo is brought to the police station for questioning but insists that, far from having anything to do with the murders, he remained unaware of what his brother was doing the entire time.

Cast
 Yekaterina Golubeva as Daiga
 Richard Courcet as Camille
 Vincent Dupont as Raphael
 Laurent Grévill as le docteur
 Alex Descas as Theo
 Irina Grjebina as Mina
 Tolsty as Vasily
 Line Renaud as Ninon
 Béatrice Dalle as Mona
 Sophie Simon as Alice
 Patrick Grandperret as Abel
 Didier Flamand as The Detective

Reception 
The film received generally positive reviews from critics, garnering a 75% fresh score on Rotten Tomatoes.

References

External links

1994 films
1994 drama films
1990s French-language films
Films directed by Claire Denis
Transgender-related films
Films set in Paris
French drama films
1990s French films